Saint Athanasius Parish is a territorial parish of the Roman Catholic Diocese of San Jose in California. The parish was established June 19, 1959, by John J. Mitty, D.D., Archbishop of San Francisco, to serve Catholics of Mountain View and Palo Alto. The parish is named for Athanasius, Patriarch of Alexandria.

Parish history
St. Athanasius parish was established June 19, 1959, at the direction of His Excellency John 1. Mitty, D.D., Archbishop of San Francisco to serve Catholics of Mountain View and Palo Alto. The founding pastor, Father Leonard W. Bose, was born January 16, 1917, to William A. Bose and Babete C. Schimmel- Bose, of San Francisco. After attending Saint Joseph's Seminary, Mountain View he went to Saint Patrick's Seminary Menlo Park, and was ordained March 20, 1943, by Archbishop Mitty in Saint Mary's Cathedral, San Francisco. Father Bose was first assigned to Burlingame. He served as associate pastor of Saint Catherine's Church until June, 1954. He also taught theology there. Two of his students were Sisters of Mercy who would aid him years later in Saint Athanasius. From Burlingame Father Bose went to Saint Brigid's in San Francisco and then to St. Mary's parish, Vacaville. He came to Saint Athanasius in June 1959. Father Bose celebrated the first Mass in Saint Athanasius on the first Sunday of Advent, November 29, 1959. He said the Mass in Latin with his back to the people, so they used missals, and those who happened to be sitting by the walls rested their missals on exposed two-by-fours. There was no kneeling, for the pews, beautiful old oaken benches that Father had salvaged from a warehouse in Burlingame, were too close together. They were filled, and people were standing. No heat, and there wouldn't be for several weeks. As Christmas drew near, it got cold, so when a heater was installed the same heater that now hangs in the corner of the multi-purpose room) there were many appreciative comments. With the cold came rain, and the onetime orchard, still unpaved, was churned into a sea of mud. Mass was offered in that modest structure for sixteen months.

Succession of priests

Several of the priests who served St Athanasius have been from the Congregation of the Holy Spirit religious order, more commonly known as Holy Ghost Fathers.

See also
Monta Loma, Mountain View

References

External links
 http://www.saintathanasius.com/ was used starting approximately May 2002 and spanning until roughly August 2016 at which point the website was hosted under domain http://stathanasiusparish.com/

Roman Catholic Diocese of San Jose in California
Athanasius
Buildings and structures in Mountain View, California
Christian organizations established in 1959
Churches in Santa Clara County, California